HMS Gentian was an  sloop that was sent to assist the Baltic States and their fight for independence. While clearing mines on 15 July 1919  and HMS Gentian also hit a mine and sank killing nine sailors in the two blasts.

Design and construction
The Arabis class was a slightly enlarged and improved derivative of the previous  and  sloops. They were designed at the start of the First World War as relatively fast minesweepers that could also carry out various miscellaneous duties in support of the fleet such as acting as dispatch vessels or carrying out towing operations, but as the war continued and the threat from German submarines grew, became increasingly involved in anti-submarine duties.

Displacement was  normal. The Arabis class had a main armament of two 4.7-inch (120 mm) guns or two 4-inch (102 mm) guns, with two 3-pounder (47 mm) anti-aircraft guns also carried.

Gentian was one of the first nine Arabis-class ships, ordered on 6 July 1915. She was built by the Greenock & Grangemouth Dockyard Company at their Greenock shipyard as Yard number 376, was launched on 23 December 1915, and was completed on 28 February 1916.

Service
On commissioning, Gentian moved to Scapa Flow in Orkney, as one of the minesweepers attached to the Grand Fleet. As such, Gentians duties were mainly confined to keeping the approaches to Scapa Flow used by the Grand Fleet clear of mines, with daily sweeping of the prescribed channels. Destroyers and aircraft were ordered out from Scapa to hunt U-43, but although a submarine was sighted, U-43 escaped unharmed. By July 1916, the Grand Fleet's minesweepers had been split into three flotillas, with Gentian joining the 2nd Fleetsweeping Flotilla. Gentian was still part of the 2nd Minesweeper Flotilla attached to the Grand Fleet at the end of the war on 11 November 1918, but by December that year had transferred to the 1st Minesweeping Flotilla, still supporting the Grand Fleet.

Gentian was listed as still a member of the 1st Flotilla, but paid off, in March 1919, and in May 1919, she was listed as in reserve at the Firth of Forth with a nucleus crew.

Baltic operations
The British campaign in the Baltic was a part of the Allied intervention in the Russian Civil War. The codename of the Royal Navy campaign was "Operation Red Trek".  The intervention played a key role in enabling the establishment of the independent states of Estonia and Latvia but failed to secure the control of Petrograd by White Russian forces, which was one of the main goals of the campaign. The taskforce was vital in supplying the Baltic states as well as containing the Soviet Navies.

On 26 June 1919, the 1st Fleet Sweeping Flotilla arrived at Biorko to reinforce the British forces in the Baltic. During the afternoon, Myrtle and Gentian were attempting to sink mines that had been brought to the surface by Lilac and Lupins sweep when Gentian struck an unswept mine. Myrtle went to Gentians assistance, but also stuck a mine, which broke off the fore part of the ship and killed six. Myrtle sank 90 minutes after striking the mine. Myrtles commanding officer, Lieutenant Commander Richard Scott, was awarded the Bronze Albert Medal for Lifesaving for his actions during the sinking, returning alone to the ship to search it for a missing man.

Wreck
In July 2010 an Estonian minesweeper located the remains of the cruiser , plus the sloops Myrtle and Gentian.

Notes

Citations and references

Cited sources
  
 
 
 
 
 
 
 
  
 
 
  
   
  
 

Maritime incidents in 1919
Shipwrecks in the Baltic Sea
Ships sunk by mines